Kongi's Harvest is a 1970s Nigerian drama film directed by Ossie Davis. The film was adapted from a screenplay by Wole Soyinka adapted from his 1965 play of the same name. Soyinka, a Nigerian playwright, poet, and the first African to be awarded the Nobel Prize in Literature in 1986, also starred in the leading role as the dictator of an African nation.

The film was produced by Francis Oladele's Calpenny Nigeria Films. The film revolved around the degeneration of personal rule in independent Africa and satirizes the resulting tyranny in terms of the confrontation between a populist politician and a traditional ruler. It is said that the film reflected the rising trend of dictatorships and tyrannical rule in Africa in the 1970s.

Production
The film was shot in Nigeria. It was the first production by a Nigerian indigenous company and its aim was to change perceptions about the country and the African continent.

The film is based on a play created by Wole Soyinka, who also appears in the film as Kongi. In an advertisement which appeared at the time of the film in the "New York Times", Soyinka dissociated himself from the film and denounced the major changes that had been made to his screenplay.

Plot
President Kongi (Wole Soyinka), the dictator of an African developing nation, is trying to modernize his nation after deposing King Oba Danlola (Rasidi Onikoyi), who is being held in prison. However, Kongi's real ambition is that of presiding over the Festival of the New Yam, a spiritual privilege of the king. Kongi struggles to take authority over the festival as King Oba Danlola had chosen to remain in prison rather than give up the last of his power to Kongi. The spiritual privilege is left to Danlola, who is the kings nephew and heir, and is shown to grow prized yams on his farm. Kongi attempts to find a way to make Danlola submit to his demands.

A third man is introduced into the film, the idealist Daodu. Daodu is the head of a group of young dissidents, who opposes the traditional political system on the one hand and the ferocious modern dictatorship on the other. Daodu's lover Segi owns a bar where Daodu is shown to spend most of his time. Segi is later revealed to have been Kongi's former lover.

The different tribes resist unification and Kongi attempts to reach his goal by any means necessary, including forcing government officials to wear traditional African outfits and seeking advice from the man he deposed. Kongi eventually demands tribute from Danlola in the form of a yam, an important food in the culture. However when Kongi is on the verge of obtaining the yam, the army rebels and the soldiers take the power into their hands. In a climactic scene at the harvest ceremony, Kongi is shot dead.

Cast
 Wole Soyinka as Kongi
 Rasidi Onikoyi as King Oba Danlola
 Femi Johnson as Organizing Secretary
 Nina Baden-Semper as Segi
 Orlando Martins as Dr. Gbenga
 Dapo Adelugba as Daodu

References

External links
 

1970 films
1970 drama films
Films directed by Ossie Davis
Nigerian drama films
Works by Wole Soyinka
1970s English-language films
English-language Nigerian films